The South Alabama Jaguars football statistical leaders are individual statistical leaders of the South Alabama Jaguars football program in various categories, including passing, rushing, receiving, total offense, defensive stats, and kicking. Within those areas, the lists identify single-game, single-season, and career leaders. The Jaguars represent the University of South Alabama in the NCAA's Sun Belt Conference.

South Alabama began competing in intercollegiate football in 2009, so unlike many college football teams, all of South Alabama's games have full box scores and there is no "pre-modern era" with incomplete statistics. During South Alabama's first two seasons, the Jaguars were listed as "unclassified" by the NCAA and players could play in games despite officially redshirting. There are 12 players on the career lists below utilized this extra full season to accumulate statistics.

These lists are updated through the end of the 2020 season.

Passing

Passing yards

Passing touchdowns

Rushing

Rushing yards

Rushing touchdowns

Receiving

Receptions

Receiving yards

Receiving touchdowns

Total offense
Total offense is the sum of passing and rushing statistics. It does not include receiving or returns.

Total offense yards

Total touchdowns

Defense

Interceptions

Tackles

Sacks

Kicking

Field goals made

Field goal percentage

References

South Alabama